Abandonada (English title:Abandoned) is a Mexican telenovela produced by Alfredo Saldaña for Televisa in 1985. It is based on the radionovela "La mesera", which is the original story of Inés Rodena and adapted by Carlos Romero.

María Sorté and José Alonso starred as protagonists.

Plot
Daniela is a young girl who falls in love with Mario Alberto, a young wealthy man. Carolina, the mother of Mario Alberto is strongly opposed to the relationship. Mario Alberto courts Daniela, gets her pregnant and then abandons her. Shattered, Daniela is unable to raise her child alone until Ernesto, a kindly man, reaches out and ends up falling for her. However, after the death of her son, Carolina blames Daniela for the misfortune and seeks revenge.

Cast 

María Sorté as Daniela
José Alonso as Ernesto
Miguel Ángel Ferriz as Mario Alberto
María Rubio as Carolina
Oscar Servin as Joaquín
Lupita Pallás as Cupertina
Julio Monterde as Alberto
Alejandra Ávalos as Alicia
Mónica Miguel as Luisa
Ariadna Welter as Lucrecia
Ricardo Cervantes as Enrique
Pedro Infante Jr. as Omar
Yolanda Ciani as Marcia
Antonio de Hud as Julián
Gloria Silva as Blanca
Antonio Henaine as Dionisio
Antonio Brillas as Martínez
Lili Inclán as Josefita
Justo Martínez as Eleuterio
Ana María Aguirre as Mariana
Mariana Maesse as China
Melba Luna as Dominga
Rocío Sobrado as Milagros
Edith Kleiman as Doctora
Mary Paz Banquells as Margarita
Armando Báez as Peña
Yamil Atala as Chemo
Diana Xochitl as Julia
Alfonso Barclay as Elpidio
Luz Elena Silva as Regina
Olivia Chavira as Bernarda
Imperio Vargas as Patricia
Norma Iturbe as Carmela
Romy Mendoza as Nelly
Ana Gloria Blanch as Neighbor

Awards

References

External links

Mexican telenovelas
1985 telenovelas
1985 Mexican television series debuts
1985 Mexican television series endings
Spanish-language telenovelas
Televisa telenovelas